The Babil governorate election of 2009 was held on 31 January 2009 alongside elections for all other governorates outside Iraqi Kurdistan and Kirkuk.

Campaign 

A candidate for the State of Law Coalition, Shaykh Haitham Kadhim al-Husaini was shot dead by gunmen who attacked his car when he left a campaign rally in Jabala district, a mixed Sunni-Shiite area where he lived. His wife and four children had been killed in a separate attack at their home two years previously. He was one of eight candidates across Iraq who were killed during the campaign.

Results 

In March, the Iraqi National Dialogue Front said they would form an alliance with the State of Law Coalition.

|- style="background-color:#E9E9E9"
! style="text-align:left;vertical-align:top;" |Coalition !! Allied national parties !! Seats (2005) !! Seats (2009) !! Change !!Votes
|-
| style="text-align:left;" | State of Law Coalition || style="text-align:left;" |Islamic Dawa Party || -|| 8||+8||60,914
|-
| style="text-align:left;" | Al Mihrab Martyr List || style="text-align:left;" |Islamic Supreme Council of Iraq || 25 || 5 || -20||40,365
|-
| style="text-align:left;" | Independent Free Movement List || style="text-align:left;" |Sadrist Movement || -|| 3 ||+3||30,119
|-
| style="text-align:left;" | National Reform Trend || || - || 3 ||+3||21,055
|-
| style="text-align:left;" | Iraqi Commission for Independent Civil Society Organizations || || - || 3 ||+3||19,875
|-
| style="text-align:left;" | Independent Justice Society || || -|| 3 ||+3||17,683
|-
| style="text-align:left;" | Iraqi National List || || -|| 3 ||+3||17,017
|-
| style="text-align:left;" | Independent al-Ansar Bloc || || -|| 2 ||+2||16,493
|-
| style="text-align:left;" | Association of Imam Ali || ||6 || - || -6
|-
| style="text-align:left;" | Al-Rasul Association || ||6 || - || -6
|-
| style="text-align:left;" | Security and reconstruction || ||2 || - || -2
|-
| style="text-align:left;" | Babel Independent Association || ||2 || - || -2 ||8,328
|-
| style="text-align:left;" | Other Parties || || ||  ||  ||256,009
|-
| style="text-align:left;" colspan=2 | Total ||41 || 30||-11||487,858
|-

|colspan=5|Sources: this article - 
|}

References 

2009 Iraqi governorate elections